The Drin Valley is a valley in northern and eastern Albania along the Drin River.

References

Valleys of Albania
Geography of Shkodër County
Geography of Kukës County
Geography of Lezhë County